The 1916 University of Utah football team was an American football team that represented the University of Utah as a member of the Rocky Mountain Conference (RMC) during the 1916 college football season. Led by third-year head coach Nelson Norgren, Utah compiled an overall record of 3–2 with a mark of 2–2 in conference play, tying for fourth place in the RMC.

Schedule

References

University of Utah
Utah Utes football seasons
University of Utah football